Tiviers is a commune in the Cantal department in south-central France.

Population

See also
Communes of the Cantal department

References

External links

Official site

Communes of Cantal